Popovice is a municipality and village in Uherské Hradiště District in the Zlín Region of the Czech Republic. It has about 1,000 inhabitants.

Twin towns – sister cities

Popovice is twinned with:
 Kálnica, Slovakia

References

Villages in Uherské Hradiště District
Moravian Slovakia